The 2019 BDO World Trophy was a major darts tournament run by the British Darts Organisation. It was held between 30 August and 1 September 2019 at King George's Hall, Blackburn, England.

Glen Durrant and Fallon Sherrock were the defending champions, after beating Michael Unterbuchner (10–7) and Lorraine Winstanley (6–3) respectively in the finals of last year's edition. However, Durrant was unable to defend his title after his switch to the PDC, while Sherrock lost 4–3 to Mikuru Suzuki in the first round.

Jim Williams claimed his maiden major title by beating Richard Veenstra 8–6 in the men's final, while Lisa Ashton won her third World Trophy after a 6–2 win over Anastasia Dobromyslova in the women's final.

Competitors

Men

Top 16 in BDO Rankings
  Richard Veenstra (runner-up)
  Jim Williams (champion)
  Wesley Harms (quarter-finals)
  Scott Mitchell (second round)
  Michael Unterbuchner (first round)
  Dave Parletti (first round)
  Gary Robson (first round)
  Scott Waites (first round)
  Wayne Warren (second round)
  Willem Mandigers (second round)
  Chris Landman (first round)
  Mario Vandenbogaerde (second round)
  Ross Montgomery (first round)
  Andy Hamilton (second round)
  Derk Telnekes (first round)
  Kyle McKinstry (first round)

17–20 in BDO Rankings

World Master
  Adam Smith-Neale (first round)

Regional Qualifiers
  Joe Chaney (quarter-finals)
  Roger Janssen (quarter-finals)
  Mark McGrath (semi-finals)
  Sebastian Steyer (semi-finals)
  Paul Hogan (first round)
  Brian Løkken (first round)
  Justin Thompson (first round)

Play-Off Qualifiers
  Scott Taylor (second round)
  Martin Adams (first round)
  Carl Hamilton (first round)
  John Scott (first round)

Draw bracket
The draws were made on 4 August 2019 at the BDO AGM.

Women

Top 8 in BDO Rankings
  Lisa Ashton (champion)
  Lorraine Winstanley (semi-finals)
  Deta Hedman (first round)
  Aileen de Graaf (semi-finals)
  Fallon Sherrock (first round)
  Anastasia Dobromyslova (runner-up)
  Laura Turner (quarter-finals)
  Trina Gulliver (first round)

9–14 in BDO Rankings

Play-Off Qualifiers
 Priscilla Steenbergen (first round)
 Kirsty Hutchinson (first round)

Draw bracket

References 

BDO World Trophy
BDO World Trophy
BDO World Trophy
Sport in Blackburn
BDO World Trophy
BDO World Trophy